Richard Lotz (born October 15, 1942) is an American professional golfer who has played on the PGA Tour and the Senior PGA Tour.

Lotz was born in Oakland, California. Along with his older brother John, he developed his game under the tutelage of noted black golf instructor Lucius Bateman whose other students included PGA Tour winners Don Whitt, John McMullin, and Tony Lema.  
 
Lotz attended San Mateo Junior College (1962–1963) and was a member of the golf team. He was the individual medalist at the California Community College Championship. He shot a record-breaking 59 in the final round of the 1963 Santa Clara County Golf Championship, which still stands. As an amateur, Lotz captured the 1960 and 1963 Alameda Commuters golf tournament, 1961 and 1962 California State Fair events, the 1962 and 1963 Stanford Invitationals, 1963 Oakland City, 1963 Santa Clara County championship, 1963 Far Western Junior Intercollegiate championship, and most notably, the 1962 California State Amateur. In 1963, his final year as an amateur, Lotz came within one stroke of becoming the first amateur since Gene Littler in 1954 and Doug Sanders in 1956, to win on the PGA Tour. He was victorious as an amateur that year in a Sectional Stroke Play tournament. Before declaring their intention to turn professional, both Lotz brothers were ranked among the nation's Top Ten Amateurs in 1963 by Golf Digest magazine. He and his brother both turned professional in 1963.

Lotz played on the PGA Tour from 1964–1978.  Among his victories were three official events, the 1969 Alameda Open, the 1970 Kemper Open and the 1970 Monsanto Open. Among the unofficial professional tournaments Lotz captured were the Chales Schultz Pro-Am Invitational, the 1972 Plantation Classic in North Carolina, the 1985 Northern California PGA Match and Medal championship, and the 1985 Blackhawk Invitational.

Lotz's career year was 1970 when he won twice, finished second at the San Antonio Open Invitational, and earned five other top ten finishes to rank 7th on the year's official money list. That performance earned Lotz Golf Digest'''s Most Improved Golfer award, along with selection by its editorial panel of experts of those most likely to capture a major in 1971. In similar fashion, Golf Magazine'' named Lotz to its PGA All-American Team.  His best performance in a major also came in 1970 – a T-8 at the PGA Championship.

After reaching the age of 50 in 1992, Lotz joined the Senior PGA Tour (now known as the Champions Tour). His best finish in this venue was a T-4 at the 1994 Bank of Boston Senior Classic. Lotz lived in Pleasanton, California for much of his adult life, but now lives in El Dorado Hills, California.

Amateur wins
1960 Alameda Commuters Championship
1961 California State Fair Men's Amateur Championships
1962 California State Fair Men's Amateur Championships, Stanford Invitational Golf Championship, California State Amateur
1963 Alameda Commuters Championship, Stanford Invitational Golf Championship, Oakland City, Santa Clara County Championship, Far Western Junior Intercollegiate Championship

Professional wins (5)

PGA Tour wins (3)

Other wins (2)
1966 Northern California Open
1985 Northern California PGA Championship

External links

American male golfers
PGA Tour golfers
PGA Tour Champions golfers
Golfers from California
Sportspeople from Oakland, California
People from Pleasanton, California
People from El Dorado Hills, California
1942 births
Living people